Frederick George Peter Ingle Finch (28 September 191614 January 1977) was an English-Australian actor of theatre, film and radio.

Born in London, he emigrated to Australia as a teenager and was raised in Sydney, where he worked in vaudeville and radio before becoming a star of Australian films. Joining the Old Vic Company after World War II, he achieved widespread critical success in Britain for both stage and screen performances. One of British cinema's most celebrated leading men of the time, Finch won the BAFTA Award for Best Actor in a Leading Role five times, and won a posthumous Academy Award for Best Actor for his portrayal of crazed television anchorman Howard Beale in the 1976 film Network.

According to the British Film Institute, "it is arguable that no other actor ever chalked up such a rewarding CV in British films, and he accumulated the awards to bolster this view.." He died only two months before the 49th Academy Awards, making him the first person to win a posthumous Oscar in an acting category. As of 2023, the only other person to have done so was fellow Australian Heath Ledger.

Early life

Family
Finch was born as Frederick George Peter Ingle Finch in London to Alicia Gladys Fisher. At the time, Alicia was married to George Finch.

George Finch was born in New South Wales, Australia, but was educated in Paris and Zürich. He was a research chemist when he moved to Britain in 1912 and later served during the First World War with the Royal Army Ordnance Depot and the Royal Field Artillery. In 1915, at Portsmouth, Hampshire, George married Alicia Fisher, the daughter of a Kent barrister. However, Peter only learned in his mid-40s that Wentworth Edward Dallas "Jock" Campbell, an Indian Army officer, not George Finch, was his biological father. George Finch divorced his wife in 1920 on the grounds of her adultery with Campbell. Alicia Finch married Jock Campbell in 1922.

Early childhood
George gained custody of Peter, who was taken from his biological mother and brought up by his adoptive paternal grandmother, Laura Finch (formerly Black), in Vaucresson, France. In 1925 Laura took Peter with her to Adyar, a theosophical community near Madras, India, for a number of months, and the young boy lived for a time in a Buddhist monastery. Undoubtedly, as a result of his childhood contact with Buddhism, Finch always claimed to be a Buddhist. He is reported to have said: "I think a man dying on a cross is a ghastly symbol for a religion. And I think a man sitting under a bo tree and becoming enlightened is a beautiful one."

In 1926 he was sent to Australia to live with his great-uncle Edward Herbert Finch at Greenwich Point in Sydney. For three years he attended the local school, then North Sydney Intermediate High School, until 1929. RAF pilot and author Paul Brickhill was a school friend.

Early career in Australia
After graduating, Finch went to work as a copy boy for the Sydney Sun and began writing. However, he was more interested in acting, and in late 1933 appeared in a play, Caprice, at the Repertory Theatre.

In 1934–35 he appeared in a number of productions for Doris Fitton at the Savoy Theatre, some with a young Sumner Locke Elliott. He also worked as a sideshow spruiker at the Sydney Royal Easter Show, in vaudeville with Joe Cody and as a foil to American comedian Bert le Blanc. At age 19 Finch toured Australia with George Sorlie's travelling troupe.

Radio work
He did radio acting work with Hugh Denison's BSA Players (for Broadcasting Service Association, later to become Macquarie Players). He came to the attention of Australian Broadcasting Commission radio drama producer Lawrence H. Cecil, who was to act as his coach and mentor throughout 1939 and 1940. He was "Chris" in the Children's Session and the first Muddle-Headed Wombat.

He later starred with Neva Carr Glyn in an enormously popular series by Max Afford as husband-and-wife detectives Jeffery and Elizabeth Blackburn as well as other ABC radio plays.

First films
Finch's first screen performance was in the short film The Magic Shoes (1935), an adaptation of the Cinderella fairy tale, where Finch played Prince Charming.

He made his feature film debut in Ken G. Hall's Dad and Dave Come to Town (1938), playing a small comic role. His performance was well received and Hall subsequently cast Finch in a larger role in Mr. Chedworth Steps Out (1939), supporting Cecil Kellaway.

Finch appeared in a war propaganda film, The Power and the Glory (1941), playing a fifth columnist.

War service
Finch enlisted in the Australian Army on 2 June 1941. He served in the Middle East and was an anti-aircraft gunner during the Bombing of Darwin.

During his war service Finch was given leave to act in radio, theatre and film. He appeared in a number of propaganda shorts, including Another Threshold (1942), These Stars Are Mine (1943), While There is Still Time (1943) and South West Pacific (1943), the latter for Ken G. Hall. He also appeared in two of the few Australian feature films made during the war, The Rats of Tobruk (1944) and the less distinguished Red Sky at Morning (1944).

Finch produced and performed Army Concert Party work, and in 1945 toured bases and hospitals with two Terence Rattigan plays he directed, French Without Tears and While the Sun Shines. He narrated the widely seen documentaries Jungle Patrol (1944) and Sons of the Anzacs (1945).

Finch was discharged from the army on 31 October 1945 at the rank of sergeant.

Post-war career in Australia
After the war, Finch continued to work extensively in radio and established himself as Australia's leading actor in that medium, winning Macquarie Awards for best actor in 1946 and 1947. He also worked as a compere, producer and writer.

In 1946, Finch co-founded the Mercury Theatre Company, which put on a number of productions in Sydney over the next few years (initially in the diminutive St James' Hall), as well as running a theatre school.

Finch continued to appear in the (rare) Australian feature films made around this time including A Son is Born (1946) and Eureka Stockade (1949). He was a leading contender to play Sir Charles Kingsford Smith in Smithy (1946) but lost out to Ron Randell.

Finch was also involved in some documentaries, narrating Indonesia Calling (1946) and helping make Primitive Peoples about the people of Arnhem Land.

Visit of Laurence Olivier and Vivien Leigh, and return to Britain
Laurence Olivier and Vivien Leigh toured Australia in 1948 with the Old Vic Company. They attended the Mercury production of The Imaginary Invalid on the factory floor of O'Brien's Glass Factory starring Finch. Olivier was impressed with Finch's acting and encouraged him to move to London, his birthplace. He left Australia permanently in 1948.

British career

Theatrical success
When Finch arrived in Britain, success came relatively early. Harry Watt arranged for a screen test at Ealing Studios which led to his being cast as a murderous actor in the movie Train of Events (1949) under the direction of Basil Dearden.

While making the film Olivier cast him as a Pole in a stage play at The Old Vic, James Bridie's Daphne Laureola (1949) supporting Edith Evans. This was a significant critical and commercial success and established Finch in London immediately. Olivier signed Finch to a five-year contract. When Train of Events came out critic C. A. Lejeune praised Finch's work in the London Observer commenting that he "adds good cheekbones to a quick intelligence and is likely to become a cult, I fear." The Scotsman said Finch "should be regarded as one of the most hopeful recruits to the British screen."

Finch had a small role as an Australian prisoner of war in the World War two drama The Wooden Horse (1950), directed by Jack Lee; this film would be the third-most-popular film at the British box office in 1950.

Finch's performance as a Pole in Daphne Laureola led to his casting as a Polish soldier in The Miniver Story (1950), the British-filmed sequel to the wartime morale boosting film Mrs. Miniver; unlike its predecessor, it was poorly received critically, but it did give Finch an experience of working for a movie financed by a major Hollywood studio.

During this time, Finch continued to appear on stage in various productions while under contract to Olivier.  He directed a stage production of The White Falcon in January 1950. In February 1950 he toured in a production of The Damascus Blade by Bridget Boland under the direction of Olivier, co starring with John Mills.

Finch returned to the London stage in Captain Carvallo by Denis Cannan, once more directed by Olivier.

Finch's closeness to the Olivier family led to an affair with Olivier's wife, Vivien Leigh, which began in 1948, and continued on and off for several years, ultimately ending owing to her deteriorating mental condition.

In March 1951 Finch replaced Dirk Bogarde for six weeks in a production of Point of Departure by Jean Anouilh. Later that year he played Iago opposite Orson Welles in a production of Othello, directed by Welles.

Despite his stage experience, according to the Sunday Times Finch, like his mentor Olivier, had stage fright, and as the 1950s progressed he worked increasingly in film.

Rising film reputation
Finch's film career received a considerable boost when cast as the Sheriff of Nottingham in The Story of Robin Hood (1952) for Walt Disney, opposite Richard Todd.

In 1952 Finch performed at St James's Theatre, King Street, London, in Sir Laurence Olivier's and Gilbert Miller's The Happy Time a comedy by Samuel Taylor. He played the part of Papa. He also did Romeo and Juliet at the Old Vic, playing Mercutio, to strong reviews.

He then made two films for Alexander Korda. In The Story of Gilbert and Sullivan (1953) Finch played Richard D'Oyly Carte opposite Robert Morley and Maurice Evans in the lead; the resulting movie was a box office disappointment. In The Heart of the Matter (1953), from the Graham Greene novel, Finch played a priest opposite Trevor Howard; his was a critical success.

Finch returned to the stage at the Old Vic with an appearance in An Italian Straw Hat by Eugène Labiche and Marc Michel adapted by Thomas Walton. He then received an offer from Paramount to star in Elephant Walk (1954), shot in Ceylon and Los Angeles. The part was intended for Laurence Olivier who turned it down, but Vivien Leigh agreed to play the female lead; Dana Andrews was the other star. The circumstances of production were turbulent; Leigh had a nervous breakdown during production, leading to her being replaced by Elizabeth Taylor. The experience helped sour Finch on a Hollywood career and he would only work occasionally there for the rest of his career.

Back in England, Finch was cast as the villain Flambeau in Father Brown (1954), receiving superb reviews opposite Alec Guinness in the title role. He narrated a documentary The Queen in Australia and had his first real star part in the Group 3/British Lion comedy, Make Me an Offer (1954), playing an antiques dealer. He was then a villain in the medieval swashbuckler The Dark Avenger (1955), opposite another Australian, Errol Flynn, for Allied Artists.

He was much in demand. C.G. Scrimgeour of Associated TV wanted Finch to play a patrol officer in a film based on Colin Simpson's articles about Shangri-La Valley in New Guinea. The Rank organisation wanted him to star in a film directed by Hugh Stewart called The Flying Doctor.

Under contract to Rank and stardom

In November 1954 Finch's contract with Olivier (five years extended to six) had expired and he signed a seven-year contract with the Rank Organisation worth £87,500 to make one film a year for them. "We are going to build Peter into a major British star", said Earl St. John, Rank's head of production, at the time.

Finch's first roles for Rank under the new arrangement gave him star parts but were, on the whole, undistinguished: Passage Home (1955), a drama with Anthony Steel and fellow Australian Diane Cilento; Josephine and Men (1955), a comedy from the Boulting Brothers with Glynis Johns and Donald Sinden; and  Simon and Laura (1955), a comedy with Kay Kendall based on a hit play. None of these films performed particularly well at the box office.

Finch was then cast as an Australian soldier in A Town Like Alice (1956), opposite Virginia McKenna under the direction of Jack Lee from the novel by Neville Shute. The World War II drama, mostly set in Malaya and almost entirely shot at Pinewood Studios, became the third-most-popular film at the British box office in 1956 and won Finch a BAFTA for Best Actor.

Finch followed it with another war movie, The Battle of the River Plate (1956), playing Captain Hans Langsdorff for the team of Powell and Pressburger. This was also hugely popular at home, and British exhibitors voted Finch the seventh-most-popular British star at the box office for 1956. In October 1956, John Davis, managing director of Rank, announced him as one of the actors under contract that Davis thought would become an international star.

Finch returned to Australia to make The Shiralee (1957), made for Ealing Studios and MGM from the novel by D'arcy Niland, under the direction of Leslie Norman. It was one of Finch's favourite parts; the resulting movie was critically acclaimed and the tenth-most-popular movie at the British box office that year.

Finch followed it with another Australian story filmed on location, the bushranger tale Robbery Under Arms (1957), which did less well, despite having the same producer and director as A Town Like Alice. However, exhibitors still voted Finch the third-most-popular British star of 1957, and the fifth most popular overall, regardless of nationality.

Finch's next two films for Rank were not particularly successful: Windom's Way (1957), where he played a doctor caught up in the Malayan Emergency (the film was shot in Corsica and London); and Operation Amsterdam (1959), a war-time diamond thriller. Finch returned to the stage for the London production of Two for the Seesaw by William Gibson, under the direction of Arthur Penn.

The Nun's Story and international stardom
Finch's career received a boost when Fred Zinnemann cast him opposite Audrey Hepburn in The Nun's Story (1959). This was an enormous financial and critical success and established Finch's reputation internationally. In August 1959 he said this and The Shiralee were the only two films he had done that he liked.

For Disney he played Alan Breck in a version of Kidnapped (1960) then went to Hollywood to make The Sins of Rachel Cade (shot in 1959, released in 1961), an attempt to repeat the success of The Nun's Story, with Angie Dickinson.

He was much in demand and still owed Rank three films under his contract. They wanted him to appear opposite Dirk Bogarde in The Singer Not the Song. Instead Finch decided to co-write and direct an award-winning short film, The Day (1960). He announced plans to direct a feature – Dig, about Australian exploration – but it did not eventuate.

Then, for a fee of £25,000 he played Oscar Wilde in The Trials of Oscar Wilde (1960), winning another BAFTA; the film, however, was not popular. He played a Labour politician in Rank's No Love for Johnnie (1961), and won his third BAFTA for Best Actor – although like Oscar Wilde, the film lost money.

Finch was originally chosen to play Julius Caesar in Cleopatra (1963) opposite Elizabeth Taylor, and filmed some scenes in London, under the direction of Robert Mamoulian. When the film was postponed Finch withdrew; new director Joseph Mankiewicz wanted to still use him, but the actor was unable to make his schedule work, and the role was recast with Rex Harrison.

Finch made two unsuccessful Hollywood films with director Robert Stevens at MGM: I Thank a Fool (1962) and In the Cool of the Day (1963). While filming the latter he was reported in the Los Angeles Times as saying that the star system was dead and the future lay in independent films. He also said he would direct a second film The Hero.

Finch restored his critical reputation with two highly acclaimed British films: The Pumpkin Eater (1964) and Girl with Green Eyes (1964). He had an uncredited cameo in First Men in the Moon (1964), then had a good role in a tough adventure film for Robert Aldrich, The Flight of the Phoenix (1965).

Finch's next three films saw him support high-profile female stars: Sophia Loren in Judith (1966), Melina Mercouri in 10:30 P.M. Summer (1966) and Julie Christie in Far from the Madding Crowd (1967). He was reunited with Aldrich for The Legend of Lylah Clare (1968). The Red Tent (1970) was an expensive international adventure film, with Finch as Umberto Nobile.

Later career
Finch's career received another boost when Ian Bannen dropped out of the lead in Sunday Bloody Sunday (1971). Finch replaced him and his performance was rewarded with another BAFTA for Best Actor and an Oscar nomination.

The momentum of this was lost somewhat by Something to Hide (1972) and the disastrous musical remake of Lost Horizon (1973). He played Lord Nelson in Bequest to the Nation (1973) and an opportunistic financier in England Made Me (1973). The Abdication (1974) was an unsuccessful historical drama.

Network
Finch was asked to audition for the part of news presenter Howard Beale in Network (1976), written by Paddy Chayefsky and directed by Sidney Lumet. The movie, with Finch as its star, was his biggest commercial and critical hit in years. His line "I'm as mad as hell, and I'm not going to take this anymore!" has become iconic.

He then played Yitzhak Rabin in Raid on Entebbe (1977).

Poet
Finch was also an occasional poet. He was encouraged by Kenneth Slessor, who published Finch's poem "Tell them" in Australian Poetry 1945, of which he was the editor. Slessor also arranged for a volume of Finch's early poems to be published. Finch's biographer Trader Faulkner reported that Finch told him that "no film award ... ever gave him the sense of fulfillment comparable to seeing a poem he'd written in print".

Personal life
Finch was married three times. In 1943, he married Romanian-born French ballerina Tamara Tchinarova; they worked together on a number of films. They had a daughter, Anita, born in 1950. They divorced in 1959, after she discovered his affair with actress Vivien Leigh in California.

Finch then married South African-born actress Yolande Turner (née Yolande Eileen Turnbull); they had two children together, Samantha and Charles Peter. During their marriage, Finch had an affair with the singer Shirley Bassey. Bassey had a daughter, also named Samantha, born in 1963; Bassey's husband at the time, the openly gay film producer Kenneth Hume, believed that Finch was Samantha's biological father. Finch and Turner divorced in 1965.

On 9 November 1973 in Rome, Finch married Mavis "Eletha" Barrett, who was known as Eletha Finch. They had a daughter together, Diana.

Death
Shortly after Raid on Entebbe finished shooting, Finch undertook a promotional tour for Network. On 13 January 1977 he appeared on The Tonight Show Starring Johnny Carson. George Carlin was also on the show that night; he joked about death. The day after, Finch had a heart attack in the lobby of the Beverly Hills Hotel and died at the age of 60. He is interred in the Hollywood Forever Cemetery.

Oscar
Finch was nominated for an Oscar for Network and went on to posthumously win the award, which was accepted by his widow, Eletha Finch. Although James Dean (twice) and Spencer Tracy had previously been posthumously nominated for a Best Actor Oscar, Finch was the first actor to win the award posthumously, as well as the first Australian actor to win a Best Actor award. He was the only posthumous winner of an Oscar in an acting category until fellow Australian Heath Ledger won the Academy Award for Best Supporting Actor in 2009; there were many earlier posthumous Oscar winners in non-acting categories. Finch also won five Best Actor awards from the British Academy of Film and Television Arts (BAFTA), including one for Network.

Shortly before he died, Finch told a journalist:We all say we're going to quit occasionally. I'd like to have been more adventurous in my career. But it's a fascinating and not ignoble profession. No one lives more lives than the actor. Movie making is like geometry and I hated maths. But this kind of jigsaw I relish. When I played Lord Nelson I worked the poop deck in his uniform. I got extraordinary shivers. Sometimes I felt like I was staring at my own coffin. I touched that character. There lies the madness. You can't fake it.

Biographies
In 1954, the Australian journalist and author George Johnston wrote a well-researched series of biographical articles on Finch, his life, and his work, which appeared in the Sydney Sun-Herald on four consecutive Sundays, which were certainly the first detailed account of Finch's life to be published. Finch later provided the inspiration for the character Archie Calverton in Johnston's novel, Clean Straw for Nothing.

In 1980, American author Elaine Dundy published a biography of Finch titled Finch, Bloody Finch: A Biography of Peter Finch. That year, his second wife, Yolande Finch, also published a posthumous account of their life together, Finchy: My Life with Peter Finch. Another biography had previously been published by his friend and colleague Trader Faulkner, in 1979.

According to an entry in Brian McFarlane's The Encyclopedia of British Film, republished on the British Film Institute's Screenonline website, Finch "did not emerge unscathed from a life of well-publicised hell-raising, and several biographies chronicle the affairs and the booze, but a serious appraisal of a great actor remains to be written."

A profile of Finch at Screenonline asserts that "it is arguable that no other actor ever chalked up such a rewarding CV in British films."

Filmography

Film

Television

Theatre credits

Australia

 Caprice by Sil Vara – Repertory Theatre, Sydney, 1933
 The Ringer by Edgar Wallace as Samuel Hackett – Studio Theatre, Sydney, 1934
 Peter Pan by J. M. Barrie as a pirate – Savoy Theatre, Sydney, 1934 (later transferred by Ben Fuller to the Majestic Theatre, Newtown) – directed by Doris Fitton
 Counsellor at Law by Elmer Rice, as the Boot Black – Savoy Theatre, Sydney, 1934 – directed by Doris Fitton with Sumner Locke Elliott
 Richard of Bordeaux by Gordon Daviot, as the fair Page Maudelyn – Savoy Theatre, Sydney, 1935 – directed by Doris Fitton with Sumner Locke Elliott and John Wyndham
 Joe Coady's Vaudeville Show – Maccabean Hall, Sydney, 1935
 Bert le Blanc's comedy show, as stooge to le Blanc – Sydney, 1935
 Jimmy Sharman's Boxing Tent, as spruiker – Royal Easter Show, Sydney, 1935
 Interference by Roland Pertwee and Harold Dearden, as Douglas Helder – St James' Hall, Sydney, 1935 – directed by Edward Howell with Howell, Rosalind Kennerdale and Therese Desmond
 False Colours by Frank Harvey – Independent Theatre, Sydney, 1935.
 So This is Hollywood – Apollo Theatre, Melbourne, 1935 – with Robert Capron, Lou Vernon and Thelma Scott
 Under the Big Top – touring show with George Sorlie, various Queensland towns, 1936, playing Herbert Hughes in Laughter of Fools by H. F. Maltby, Smithers in Married by Proxy by Avery Hopwood, Peter in Fair and Warmer by Avery Hopwood, Hunter in Ten Minute Alibi by William Armstrong – all directed by William McGowan with Murray Matheson, Rosalind Kennerdale, Leslie Crane, Eva Moss, Norman French, Julia Adair and George Douglas.
 White Cargo by Leon Gordon, as Ashley – Theatre Royal, Sydney, 1938 – directed by Ben Lewin with Mary MacGregr, James Raglan, Frank Bradley
 Personal Appearance by Laurence Riley as Clyde Pelton – Theatre Royal, Sydney and Comedy Theatre, Melbourne, 1938 – directed by Peter Dearing, with Betty Balfour, Frank Bradley, Cecil Perry
 Army Concert Party work 1941–1944
 Night of January 16th by Ayn Rand, as DA Flint – Minerva Theatre, Sydney, 1944 – directed by Frederick J Blackman with Lawrence H. Cecil and Thelma Grigg
 While the Sun Shines by Terence Rattigan, as the Earl of Harpenden – Minerva Theatre, Sydney 1944 – directed by Frederick J Blackman with Pat McDonald, Ron Randell, Roger Barry (later toured this production to army hospitals and bases in 1945)
 French Without Tears by Terence Rattigan – various army hospitals and bases, 1945 – Finch directed
 Diamond Cuts Diamond by Nicolai Gogol, as Ikharev – Conservatorium of Music, Sydney, 16–17 July 1946 – directed by Sydney John Kay
 The Pastry Baker by Lope de Vega – Conservatorium of Music, Sydney, 16–17 July 1946 – director only
 The Broken Pitcher by Heinrich von Kleist, as Adam – Conservatorium of Music, Sydney, 16–17 July 1946
 French Without Tears by Terence Rattigan – Killara Hall, Sydney and Sydney Radio Theatre, 1947 – Finch directed a cast including Leonard Thiele, Tom Lake, Alan White, Adele Brown, Ron Patten
 Midsummer Night by Lajos Bíró – touring production, Sydney 1948 – directed only
 Anatole's Wedding Morning by Arthur Schnitzler – touring production, Sydney 1948 – directed only
 The Imaginary Invalid by Molière, as Argan – O'Brien's Glass Factory and Sydney Town Hall, Sydney, 1948 – directed by Sydney John Kay with June Wimble, Elsie Dane, Al Thomas, John Faassen, Patricia Harrison, Allan Ashbolt, Tom Lake

United Kingdom

 Daphne Laureola by James Bridie, as Ernest Piaste – Wyndham's Theatre, London, 1949 – directed by Murray MacDonald for Laurence Olivier Productions with Edith Evans and Felix Aylmer
 The Damascus Blade by Bridget Boland, as Henry Adams – provincial tour, 1950 – directed by Laurence Olivier for Laurence Olivier Productions with John Mills and Beatrix Lehmann
 The White Falcon – provincial tour, 1950 – starring Basil Radford and Sheila Burrel – Finch worked on this as a director only
 Captain Carvallo by Denis Cannan, as Professor Winke – St James Theatre, London, 1950 – directed by Laurence Olivier for Laurence Olivier Productions with Diana Wynyard and Jill Bennett
 Point of Departure by Jean Anouilh and Kitty Black, as Orpheus – Duke of York Theatre, London, 1951 – directed by Peter Ashmore for the Company of Four with Mai Zetterling and Stephen Murray (Finch replaced Dirk Bogarde for six weeks on 12 March 1951)
 Othello by William Shakespeare, as Iago – St James Theatre, London, 1951 – directed by Orson Welles for Laurence Olivier Productions with Orson Welles, Gudrun Ure, Maxine Audley and Edward Mulhare
 The Happy Time by Samuel Taylor, as Papa – St James Theatre, London, 1952 – directed by George Devine for Laurence Olivier Productions, with Geneviève Page, Ronald Squire, George Devine, Rachel Kempson
 Romeo and Juliet by William Shakespeare, as Mercutio – Old Vic Theatre, London, 1952 – directed by Denis Carey with Claire Bloom, Athene Seyler, Lewis Casson and Alan Badel
 An Italian Straw Hat by Eugène Labiche and Marc Michel adapted by Thomas Walton, as Mons Beaujolais – Old Vic Theatre, London, 1953 – directed by Denis Carey with Laurence Payne, Paul Rogers, Jane Wenham, Gudrun Ure
 Two for the Seesaw by William Gibson, as Jerry Ryan – Theatre Royal, Brighton and Theatre Royal Haymarket, London, 1958–59 – directed by Arthur Penn for H. M. Tennent with Gerry Jedd
 The Seagull by Anton Chekhov translated by Ann Jellicoe, as Trigorin – Queen's Theatre, London, 1964 – directed by Tony Richardson with Peggy Ashcroft, Peter McEnery, Vanessa Redgrave, Paul Rogers and George Devine.

Partial radio credits 

 The Laughing Woman (1939)
 Interference (1939) – the first episode of Australia's version of Lux Theatre of the Air
 Men in White (1939)
 The Daughter of the Dragon (1939)
 Night Nurse (1939)
 Mutiny on the Bounty (1941)
 Mr Deeds Comes to Town (1941)
 The Laughing Woman (1946) – reprise of his performance for which Finch won the 1946 Macquarie Award for Best Male Actor on Australian radio
 Such Men Are Dangerous (1946) as Czar Paul I
 Crime and Punishment (1946) as Raskolnikov
 Redemption (1946) by Tolstoy – Finch won the 1947 Macquarie Award for Best Male Actor on Australian radio
 When You Come Home (1946)
 Big Sister (1946)
 Crossroads of Life (1946)
 Man of Destiny (1948)

Awards and nominations

Notes

References
Dundy, Elaine. Finch, Bloody Finch: A Biography of Peter Finch. New York: Holt, Rinehart & Winston, 1980.  (10).  (13).
Faulkner, Trader. Peter Finch: A Biography. London: Angus & Robertson, 1979.  (10).  (13).
Finch, Yolande. Finchy: My Life with Peter Finch. London: Arrow Books, 1980.  (10).  (13).
Johnson, G., "The Success Story of Peter Finch", The Sun-Herald (Sydney) (Sunday, 8 August 1954), pp. 21–23
Johnson, G., "The Long Road to London" (Sunday, 15 August 1954), pp. 23–25
Johnson, G., "Dad and Dave, and then the War." The Sun-Herald (Sydney) 15 Aug 1954: 23
Johnson, G., "The Thames is Non-Inflammable- But an Australian in London Leapt Up a STAIRWAY TO STARDOM." The Sun-Herald (Sydney) 22 Aug 1954: 23
Johnson, G., "The Threat and the Promise". The Sun-Herald (Sydney) 29 Aug 1954: 47

External links

. (N.B.: Miscalculates age at time of death as 61, not 60.)

Peter Finch Australian theatre credits at AusStage
Peter Finch at Australian Dictionary of Biography
Audio interview with Peter Finch from 1973 discussing Australia
Documentation relating to Peter Finch's war service at National Archives of Australia

1916 births
1977 deaths
20th-century Australian male actors
20th-century Australian poets
20th-century English male actors
20th-century English poets
Australian Army soldiers
Australian expatriate male actors in the United States
Australian male film actors
Australian Army personnel of World War II
Australian male poets
Australian male radio actors
Australian male stage actors
Best Actor Academy Award winners
Best Actor BAFTA Award winners
Best British Actor BAFTA Award winners
Best Drama Actor Golden Globe (film) winners
British emigrants to Australia
Burials at Hollywood Forever Cemetery
English male film actors
English male radio actors
English male stage actors
English male poets
Male actors from Sydney
Military personnel from London
Poets from Sydney
Silver Bear for Best Actor winners